Joe Right is a retired American soccer goalkeeper who played three seasons in the North American Soccer League.

Right attended Florissant Valley Community College for at least one year.  In 1969, he was part of the FVCC National Junior College National Championships.  He was also a 1969 NJCAA All American.  In 1970, he signed with the St. Louis Stars of the North American Soccer League.  He played thirteen games for the Stars in 1970, but only five in 1971.  Following the 1971 season, he left the Stars and the NASL.

He was inducted into the St. Louis Soccer Hall of Fame in 2008.

References

1950 births
Soccer players from St. Louis
American soccer players
Association football goalkeepers
North American Soccer League (1968–1984) players
St. Louis Stars (soccer) players
Living people
St. Louis Community College alumni
Junior college men's soccer players in the United States